Hangar-e Pain (also Romanized as Hangar-e Pā’īn; also known as Hangar-e Mīān) is a village in Hotkan Rural District, in the Central District of Zarand County, Kerman Province, Iran. At the 2006 census, its population was 8, in 4 families.

References 

Populated places in Zarand County